c/o Segemyhr (read care of Segemyhr) was a Swedish sitcom that premiered on TV4 Sweden on 4 September 1998. The series took place in and around an apartment in an exclusive neighbourhood in Stockholm, Artillerigatan 35 (in reality Grevgatan 14) and later Styrmansgatan 52 in the same area.

The series began with three seasons from fall 1998 to fall 1999, thereafter additionally two seasons were added in 2003–2004. All seasons have been released on DVD. Script writers were Fredrik Lindström och Erik Haag.

Plot
The series centers around distinguished Fredrik Segemyhr, the owner of the apartment, portrayed by Johan Ulveson. The other three main characters are his girlfriend Cecilia Jansson, "Cilla", portrayed by Sussie Eriksson, Fredrik's friend and casual labourer Jan-Olof, portrayed by Lennart Jähkel and taxi driver Anton, portrayed by Olle Sarri.

Fredrik is an egocentric former top executive in the finance sector, who has happened to have lost his job. He refuses to admit to being unemployed, and states that he is "between jobs". He is feverishly trying to return to work life, and on his way back he tries to get both top positions but also somewhat unconventional jobs. Among other things he tries to become a sports commentator, art curator and Christmas magazine salesman, but fails everything he tries. Fredrik is Throughout the course of the show, with a few exceptions, Fredrik is in a relationship with Cilla, a relatively normal assistant nurse in her 30s. Because of Fredrik's lack of employment he can't pay his rent, and is forced to bring in two lodgers, Jan-Olof and Anton. Jan-Olof is a sex-obsessed casual laborer in his 50s without any big plans of settling down. Anton is a shy and insecure guy in his early twenties who drives a taxi but has dreams of becoming famous in one way or another. He only lives with Fredrik because he can't stand living with his mother, and can't afford a place of his own. In the first episode, Fredrik, Cilla and Jan-Olof are already living in the apartment, while Anton moves in after an offer from Jan-Olof in the middle of the first episode.

Actors

Main characters

Guest actors

Recurring guests

External links

Swedish television sitcoms
1998 Swedish television series debuts
2004 Swedish television series endings